Shukrullo (pen name of Shukrullo Yusupov; 2 September 1921 – 19 July 2020) was an Uzbek poet.

Shukrullo Yusupov was born on September 2, 1921 in Tashkent, in the mahallah (quarter) Olmazor. The writer's father, Yusufkhodzha, was a rather famous healer in Tashkent.

In 1938 he graduated from the Pedagogical College and began teaching in Karakalpakstan. In 1944, after graduating from the Tashkent Pedagogical Institute, he entered the postgraduate courses of Central Asian State University (SAGU), specializing in foreign literature. Since 1946, a member of the Union of Writers of the Uzbek SSR. The first collection of poems entitled "The Law of Happiness" was published in 1949. 

In 1949 Shukrullo Yusupov was arrested along with a number of famous writers and poets of Uzbekistan Hamid Suleiman, Mirzakolon Ismaili, Shukhrat, brothers Alimukhamedov and Mahmud Muradov. The investigation lasted 15 months and in 1951 he was convicted on charges of nationalism and anti-Soviet activity, sentenced to 25 years in prison and 5 disqualifications. Staged at Gorlag, participated in the Norilsk uprising. Shukhrat, Mirzakalon, Hamid Suleiman were convicted in the same case with him. In September 1954 he was sent to Tashkent to review the case, at the end of 1954 - beginning of 1955 he was released. The arrest, investigation and stay in the camp are described in the autobiographical story "Buried without a shroud." The publication of the story became possible only after the collapse of the USSR, in 1991. 

His poetry has been translated into many languages, and has appeared in magazines and anthologies. He was honored with Uzbekistan's Hamza Award and the title of Uzbekistan People's Poet.

References

1921 births
2020 deaths
Writers from Tashkent
Uzbekistani male poets
Soviet male poets
Participants in the Norilsk uprising
People's Poets of Uzbekistan